Prath may refer to:

The Syriac name of the Euphrates river
Prath, Germany